‘Ilm ( "knowledge") is the Islamic term for knowledge.

Meaning of knowledge

Linguistic
According to the Oxford English Dictionary, the word knowledge refers to "Facts, information, and skills acquired through experience or education; the theoretical or practical understanding of a subject."

Islamic meaning
Knowledge in the Western world means information about something, divine or corporeal, while In Islamic point of view 'ilm is an all-embracing term covering theory, action and education, it is not confined to the acquisition of knowledge only, but also embraces socio-political and moral aspects.it requires insight, commitment  to the goals of Islam  and for the believers to act upon their belief. 
Also it is reported in hadith that "Knowledge is not extensive learning. Rather, it is a light that God casts in the heart of whomever He wills."

Shiism and knowledge

Doctrine about necessity of acquiring knowledge
According to Allameh Muzaffar, Allah gives humans the faculty of reason and argument. Also Allah orders human to spend time thinking carefully on creation while he refers to all creations as his signs of power and glory. These signs encompassed all of universe. Also there is similarity between human as little world and universe as large world. Allah doesn't accept the faith of those who follow him without thinking and only with imitation but also Allah blames them for such an action.
In other words, humans have to think about the universe with reason and intellect, a faculty bestowed us by Allah.  Since that there is more insistence on the faculty of intellect among Shia, even evaluating the claims of someone who claims prophecy is on the shoulder of intellect. 
The Qur'an is said to demand the acquisition of knowledge. It explains the study and development of sciences during the Islamic Golden Age.

Ilm in Islam

In Qur'an
In the Qur'an the word 'alim has occurred in 140 places, while al-'ilm in 27. In all, the total number of verses in which 'ilm or its derivatives and associated words are used is 704. The aids of knowledge such as book,  pen, ink etc.  amount to almost the same number. Qalam occurs in two places, al-kitab in 230 verses, among which al-kitab for al-Qur'an occurs in 81 verses. Other words associated with writing occur in 319 verses.

In Hadith
Various leading Hadith books have specific chapters based on Ilm or knowledge.

References 

Islamic terminology